Jimmie Watkins "Jim" Phillips, Sr. (July 21, 1931 – May 25, 2018) was an American politician who served in the North Carolina Senate from 1997 to 2001. A Democrat, he represented senate district 23.

Early life and education 
Phillips was born in Tarboro, North Carolina. He was raised in Bassett, Virginia and graduated from Bassett High School. He served in the United States Marine Corps during the Korean War. He then attended to University of North Carolina at Chapel Hill and High Point University.

Career 
From 1960 to 1974, Phillips served as director of transportation for the Davidson County Schools. In 1974, Phillips served as Davidson County manager. From 1978 to 1994, he served as an aide to Congressman Stephen L. Neal.

Personal life 
Phillips lived in Lexington, North Carolina. He died at his home in Lexington, North Carolina on May 25, 2018.

References

External links

1931 births
2018 deaths
People from Bassett, Virginia
People from Tarboro, North Carolina
People from Lexington, North Carolina
Military personnel from North Carolina
High Point University alumni
University of North Carolina at Chapel Hill alumni
Democratic Party North Carolina state senators